The Inter Baku 2012–13 season is Inter Baku's twelfth Azerbaijan Premier League season, and their fourth season under manager Kakhaber Tskhadadze.

Squad 

 (captain)

Out on loan

Transfers

Summer

In:

Out:

Winter

In:

 

Out:

Competitions

Friendlies

Azerbaijan Premier League

Results summary

Results by round

Results

League table

Azerbaijan Premier League Championship Group

Results summary

Results by round

Results

Table

Azerbaijan Cup

UEFA Europa League

Qualifying phase

Squad statistics

Appearances and goals

|-
|colspan="14"|Players who left Inter Baku during the season:

Goal scorers

Disciplinary record

Team kit
These are the 2012–13 Inter Baku kits.

|
|

References
Qarabağ have played their home games at the Tofiq Bahramov Stadium since 1993 due to the ongoing situation in Quzanlı.
Narva Trans played their home match at Rakvere linnastaadion, Rakvere instead of their own Kreenholmi Stadium.
Inter Baku played their home match at Dalga Arena, Baku as their own Shafa Stadium does not meet UEFA criteria.

External links 
 Inter Baku at Soccerway.com

Inter
Shamakhi FK seasons